The  team relay luge at the 2018 Winter Olympics was held on 15 February 2018 at the Alpensia Sliding Centre near Pyeongchang, South Korea.

Qualifying teams

Results
The event started at 21:30.

References

Luge at the 2018 Winter Olympics
Mixed events at the 2018 Winter Olympics